Jacqueline Makokha or Jackline Makokha (born 15 November 1974) is a former Kenyan female volleyball player. She was part of the Kenya women's national volleyball team.

She participated in the 1994 FIVB Volleyball Women's World Championship.
She competed with the national team at the 2000 Summer Olympics in Sydney, Australia, finishing 11th.

See also
 Kenya at the 2000 Summer Olympics

References

External links
 

1974 births
Living people
Kenyan women's volleyball players
Place of birth missing (living people)
Volleyball players at the 2000 Summer Olympics
Olympic volleyball players of Kenya